Netta Syrett (17 March 1865 – 15 December 1943) was an English writer of the late Victorian period whose novels featured New Woman protagonists. Her novel Portrait of a Rebel was adapted into the 1936 film A Woman Rebels.

Biography

Early life and education
Netta Syrett was born Janet Syrett on 17 March 1865 in Ramsgate, Kent. She was one of five daughters (of thirteen children) born to silk merchant Ernest Syrett (d.1906) and Mary Ann, née Stembridge (d.1923) and the niece of writer Grant Allen. Three of her sisters, Nellie Syrett (b. 1882) Kate Syrett and Mabel Syrett (1871 – 1961), were artists, designers and illustrators.  First educated at home by their mother and a German governess, Syrett left home at age 11 to attend North London Collegiate School. She continued her education at Hughes Hall, Cambridge where she completed the three years' coursework necessary for a full teaching certificate in one year.

Career
Syrett taught for two years at a school in Swansea before accepting a post at the London Polytechnic School for Girls. Through her friend and coworker Mabel Beardsley, Netta met Aubrey Beardsley, Mabel's brother, and through him she was introduced to Henry Harland and included in his circle of friends. Harland published three of her short stories in the Yellow Book. her sisters Nellie Syrett and Mabel Syrett also contributed to The Yellow Book.

Syrett's first novel, Nobody's Fault (1896), was published by The Bodley Head in their Keynote series. Her writing and teaching careers coincided until 1902, when her play The Finding of Nancy received negative attention after Clement Scott, writing for Daily Telegraph (9 May 1902), insinuated that the play was thinly disguised autobiography. Syrett was asked to resign her teaching position after a student's mother read Scott's review. By that time, novel writing had become for her "a sure thing" and Syrett continued to turn out a novel per year until retiring in 1939.

Death and afterward
Syrett died in London on 15 December 1943 following a long illness.

Published works

Novels

Nobody's Fault (1896)
The Tree of Life (1897)
Rosanne (1902)
The Day's Journey (1905)
The Child of Promise (1907)
Anne Page (1908)
A Castle of Dreams (1909)
Olivia L. Carew (1910)
Drender's Daughter (1911)
Three Women (1912)
The Endless Journey and Other Stories (1912)
Stories from Mediaeval Romance (1913)
Barbara of the Thorn (1913)
The Jam Queen (1914)
The Victorians (1915; republished as Rose Cottingham)
Rose Cottingham Married (1916)
Troublers of the Peace (1917)

The Wife of a Hero (1918)
The God of Chance (1920)
As the Stars Come Out (1920?)
Cupid and Mr. Pepys (1923)
The House in Garden Square (1924)
The Shuttles of Eternity (1928)
Portrait of a Rebel (1930)
The Path to the Sun (1931)
Strange Marriage (1931)
Moon Out of the Sky (1932)
Who was Florriemay? (1932)
The House That Was (1933)
The Farm on the Downs (1936)
Angel Unawares (1936)
Fulfilment (1938)
...As Dreams Are Made On (1939)
Gemini (1940)
Lady Gem published by Hutchinson & Co., Paternoster Row, E.C.

Plays
The Finding of Nancy (1902)
Two Domestics (1922)

Short stories
"Sylvia" (Macmillan's, 1891)
"Thy Heart's Desire" (Yellow Book, July 1894)
"A Correspondence" (Yellow Book, October 1895)
"Her Wedding Day" (Quarto, 1896)
"Fairy-Gold" (Temple Bar, 1896)
"Far Above Rubies" (Yellow Book, January 1897)
"Chiffon" (Pall Mall, 1900)
"A Revelation in Arcadia" (Harper's, August 1902)
"Poor Little Mrs. Villiers" (Venture, 1903)
"An Idealist" (Harper's, May 1903)
"A Common Occurrence" (Harper's, February 1904)
"Madame de Meline" (Acorn, October 1905)
"The Street of the Four Winds" ("The Jabberwock". May 1906)

Children's books

The Garden of Delight: Fairy Tales (1898)
The Magic City and Other Fairy Tales (1903)
Six Fairy Plays for Children (1904)
The Dream Garden (1905)
The Day's Journey (1906)
The Hidden Country (1907)The Castle of Four Towers (1908)The Vanishing Princess (1910)The Old Miracle Plays of England (1911)Godmother's Garden (1918)Robin Goodfellow and Other Fairy Plays for Children (1918)Toby and the Odd Beasts (1921)Rachel and the Seven Wonders (1921)The Fairy Doll and Other Plays for Children (1922)Magic London (1922)Tinkelly Winkle (1923)The Magic Castle and Other Stories (1925)

Other worksThe story of Saint Catherine of Siena (1910)Sketches of European History (1931)The Sheltering Tree'' (autobiography, 1939)

References

External links
 
 
 
 
 Works by Netta Syrett at Open Library

 

1865 births
1943 deaths
Alumni of Hughes Hall, Cambridge
English children's writers
English dramatists and playwrights
20th-century English novelists
English short story writers
English women dramatists and playwrights
People from Ramsgate
People educated at North London Collegiate School
British women short story writers
English women novelists
20th-century English women writers
20th-century British short story writers